Ninth Street is a 1999 black-and-white drama film.

Ninth Street may also refer to:
 9th Street station (SEPTA), a SEPTA station in Lansdale, Pennsylvania
 9–10th & Locust station, a PATCO station in Philadelphia, Pennsylvania 
 9th Street station (Charlotte), a LYNX station in Charlotte, North Carolina
 Ninth Street station (PATH), a rapid transit railroad station in New York
 9th Street–Congress Street station, a light rail station in Hoboken, New Jersey
 9th Street station (GRTC), a GRTC Pulse bus rapid transit station in Richmond, Virginia
 Auraria 9th Street Historic District, a historic district in Denver, Colorado
 Fourth Avenue/Ninth Street station, a New York City Subway station complex
 Ninth Street Historic District, an Ohio Registered Historic Place
 Ninth Street station (BMT Fifth Avenue Line), a defunct New York City Subway station
 Ninth Street station (IRT Third Avenue Line), a defunct New York City Subway station
 9th Street Art Exhibition, an art exhibition